A Bologna bottle, also known as a Bologna phial or philosophical vial, is a glass bottle which has great external strength, often used in physics demonstrations and magic tricks. The exterior is generally strong enough that one could pound a nail into a block of wood using the bottle as a hammer; however, even a small scratch on the interior would cause it to crumble.

It is created by heating a glass bottle and then rapidly cooling the outside whilst slowly cooling the inside. This causes external compression and internal tension such that even a scratch on the inside is sufficient to shatter the bottle.

The effect is utilized in several magic effects, including the "Devil's Flask".

Manufacture

To create the desired effect, the bottles are rapidly cooled on the outside and slow cooled on the inside during the glass-making process. This causes the outside to be extremely hard, and the inside to be soft and susceptible to damage which can release the powerful internal stresses. The glass is not annealed. Reheating the glass and then allowing it to cool slowly will remove the unique properties from the glass.

Uses
Because of the seemingly paradoxical nature of the glass (being both extremely durable and extremely fragile), Bologna bottles are often used as props in magic tricks, where the bottle can be shattered by rattling a small object inside it.

History
Mentioned in the publication of the Royal Society around 1740s, the Bologna bottle is named for where it was first discovered in Bologna, Italy. During this period, a glassblower would create a Bologna bottle by leaving the bottle in the open air instead of immediately placing the bottle back into the furnace to cool (annealing). This produced a special phenomenon, where the bottle would remain intact even when dropped from a distance onto the brick floor, but would immediately rupture if a small piece of flint were placed inside.

Although the bottle can resist a strong external force, the extremely fragile flaws inside the bottle prevent it from being used in practical applications.

See also
 List of bottle types, brands and companies
 Prince Rupert's Drop

References

External links
 A demonstration of the principle as a magic trick, using a coca-cola bottle as the vessel.

Glass bottles
Glass engineering and science
Glass physics
Magic tricks
Prop design